Anna Margaret Mullikin (March 7, 1893 – August 24, 1975) was a mathematician who was one of the early investigators of point set theory. She received her BA from Goucher College in 1915 and went on to attend University of Pennsylvania for doctoral work. She was Robert Lee Moore's third student, graduating in 1922 with a dissertation entitled Certain Theorems Relating to Plane Connected Point Sets. Her dissertation was published that year in Transactions of the American Mathematical Society and subsequently became the catalyst for significant advances in the field. She spent most of her subsequent career as a secondary school mathematics teacher. During 1921–1922 she had taught at Oak Lane Country Day School, which served preschool and elementary-aged children. She later became a mathematics teacher at Germantown High School (Philadelphia); there she became a mentor to Mary-Elizabeth Hamstrom, who became a student of Moore and professional mathematician herself.

References

External links
 
 MacTutor page
  Biography on p. 448-450 of the Supplementary Material at AMS

1893 births
1975 deaths
Goucher College alumni
20th-century American mathematicians
American women mathematicians
20th-century women mathematicians
20th-century American women